Adoma Akosua (born. 1773) was a queen mother of the kingdom of Ashanti in West Africa.

Background 
She was born in Kumasi in 1773 and rose to become queen mother of the kingdom of Ashanti in 1809 following the death of the incumbent Konadu Yaadom. Although there were several suitable candidates including her younger sister called Ama Serwaa who later became a queen mother herself, her position as senior of the royal women in her generation gave her the clear advantage to succeed Konadu Yaadom.

Death 
Adoma Akosua formed a relationship with the chief of Bron with the intention of overthrowing King Osei Bonsu and helping the chief of Bron to assume the position. King Osei Bonsu had left for a military expedition against the people of Gyaaman and entrusted the civil government of the kingdom of Ashanti in the hands of Adoma Akosua. In his absence, Adoma Akosua performed King Osei Bonsu's funeral rites with the belief that the performance will afflict him so that he will die as a result. Other sources suggest she wanted to overthrow the Osei Bonsu for one of her two sons to assume the kingship.

Her rebellion was quelled when by a loyalist of king Bonsu when he returned to the capital. Adoma Akosua was banished from the royal ward and she died in 1838 after serving as queen mother for 10 years between 1809 and 1819.

References

Ghanaian royalty